Didymograptus is an extinct genus of graptolites with four rows of cups. They lived during the Middle Ordovician, to Late Ordovician.

Distribution 
Fossils of Didymograptus have been found in Argentina, Australia, Bolivia, Canada (Northwest Territories, Quebec, Yukon, Newfoundland and Labrador), Chile, China, Colombia (Tarqui, Huila), the Czech Republic, Estonia, France, Iran, Morocco, New Zealand, Norway, Peru, Portugal, the Russian Federation, Saudi Arabia, Spain, Sweden, the United Kingdom, the United States (Alaska, California, Idaho, Nevada, New York, Utah), and Venezuela.

References

Bibliography 
 

Graptolite genera
Ordovician invertebrates
Paleozoic animals of Oceania
Ordovician animals of Africa
Ordovician animals of Asia
Ordovician animals of Europe
Ordovician animals of North America
Ordovician Canada
Ordovician United States
Ordovician animals of South America
Ordovician Argentina
Ordovician Bolivia
Ordovician Colombia
Fossils of Colombia
Ordovician Peru
Ordovician Venezuela
Fossil taxa described in 1851
Paleozoic life of Newfoundland and Labrador
Paleozoic life of the Northwest Territories
Paleozoic life of Quebec
Paleozoic life of Yukon